Among those who were born in the London Borough of Croydon, or have dwelt within the borders of the modern borough are (alphabetical order):

A

 Feroz Abbasi, arrested in Afghanistan in 2001 and detained at Guantanamo Bay; lived in Shirley and attended school in Croydon
 Adegbenga Adejumo (1987–), Croydon born dubstep producer known as Benga
 Allan Ahlberg (1938–), children's writer (Penguin)
 Waheed Alli (1964–), born and raised in the north of Croydon; multimillionaire media entrepreneur and politician; co-founder of Planet 24 TV production company; MD at Carlton Television; currently chairman of ASOS.com and Chorion Ltd.; a Labour peer; one of very few openly gay Muslim politicians in the world
 Aaron Wan-Bissaka, Professional Football player who plays for Premier League club Manchester United born in Croydon
Dame Peggy Ashcroft (1907–1991), actress, born in Croydon and lived in George Street as a child; honoured in the naming of the Ashcroft Theatre, part of the Fairfield Halls; was a school friend of architect Jane Drew
 Lionel Atwill (1885-1946), stage and screen actor, was born in Croydon

B

 Jeannie Baker (1940–), artist, author, designer and animator
 Cicely Mary Barker (1895–1973), illustrator and artist; created the famous Flower Fairies books; born in Croydon and lived locally; studied at the Croydon School of Art
 Jon Benjamin (1964–), Chief Executive of the Board of Deputies of British Jews since 2005; born and grew up in Croydon, and educated at Park Hill Primary School and Dulwich College
 Edward White Benson, Archbishop of Canterbury (1883–1896); lived at Addington Palace; invented Christmas tradition of Festival of Nine Lessons and Carols
 Jeff Beck (1944–), guitarist
Jay Bernard (writer) (1988–), FRSL, writer, artist, film programmer, and activist, raised in Croydon
 Keith Berry (1973–), musician and composer
 Frederick Betts (1859–1944), donated Betts Park and built large areas in Croydon and Penge
 Emily Blunt (1983–), actress; she and husband John Krasinski own an apartment in East Croydon 
 James Booth (1927–2005), actor (Zulu)
 Dane Bowers (1979–), singer, attended Trinity School
 Derren Brown, illusionist; born and brought up in Purley
 James Buckley, actor, best known for playing Jay Cartwright in The Inbetweeners
 Raymond Burns (1954–), musician, member of punk rock band the Damned; also known by the name Captain Sensible
 Mark Butcher (1972–), Surrey and England cricketer; born in Croydon, attended Trinity School

C

 Alison Carroll, actress
 Raymond Chandler (1888–1959), screenwriter and author
 Anne Clark (poet) (1960–), poet, songwriter and electronic musician
 Klariza Clayton (1989–), actress
 Martin Clunes (1961–), actor, resident
 Carlton Cole, ex footballer, born in Croydon
 Ronnie Corbett, comic actor, lived for many years in Addington, London
 Frederick George Creed (1871–1957), electrical engineer and inventor of the teleprinter; lived and died at 20 Outram Road, Addiscombe
 Peter Cushing (1913–1994), actor; born in Kenley, lived in Purley

D

 Tasha Danvers-Smith (1977–), champion hurdler
 Michael Dapaah (1991–), actor and comedian, attended Thomas More Catholic School, Purley
 Bertrand Dawson (1864–1945), physician to the British Royal Family and President of the Royal College of Physicians
 Desmond Dekker (1941–2006), ska musician, lived in Thornton Heath
 R.F. Delderfield (1912–1972), writer and dramatist; lived at 22 Ashburton Avenue, Addiscombe, 1918–1923; his "Avenue" series is based on his life in Addiscombe & Shirley Park; many of his works were adapted for television
 Norman Demuth (1898–1968), composer and musicologist, born at 91 St James' Road.
 Luol Deng (1985–), basketball player for the Chicago Bulls and Great Britain; raised in South Norwood
 Sir Arthur Conan Doyle (1859–1930), author and creator of Sherlock Holmes; lived at 12 Tennison Road, South Norwood 1891–1894
 Jane Drew (1911–1996), architect and town planner; born at 8 Parchmore Road, Thornton Heath; went to Croydon High School and was a school friend of Dame Peggy Ashcroft
 Jacqueline du Pré (1945–1987), British cellist, acknowledged as one of the greatest players of the instrument, but whose career was cut short by multiple sclerosis; lived in Purley and attended Croydon High School
 Des'ree (1968-), award-winning English recording artist.

E

 Havelock Ellis (1859–1939), Victorian sexologist, born in Croydon
 Tracey Emin (1963–), artist
 Carlos Ezquerra (1947–2018), comics artist, co-creator of Judge Dredd

F

 Noel Fielding (1973–), comedian, writer, actor, artist, co-creator of The Mighty Boosh
 Matthew Fisher (1946–), musician, Procol Harum, composer of "Whiter Shade of Pale"
 Kenelm Foss (1885–1963), actor, theatre director, author, screenwriter and film director, born in Croydon
 Alexander Francis (1995–), musician, composer
 Vincent Frank (1985–), musician, Frankmusik
 Donna Fraser (1972–), international athlete
 Ian Frazer, poker player
 Neil Fraser (1955–), dub musician/producer (AKA Mad Professor)
Jacqueline Froom (1929–2018), poet, lyricist, and teacher
 Charles Burgess Fry (1872–1956), polymath – sportsman, politician, teacher, writer, editor, publisher

G

 Paul Garelli (1924–2006), French Assyriologist
 Trevor Goddard (1962–2003), actor
 JB Gill (1986–), singer with British boyband JLS, farmer and TV presenter
 Sir Philip Green (1952–), Croydon born billionaire, owner of the Arcadia Group
 Deryck Guyler (1914–1999), actor

H

 Ben Haenow (1985–), winner of the eleventh series of The X Factor
 Will Hay (1888–1949), comic actor; lived at 45 The Chase, Norbury, 1927–1934
 Simon Haynes (1967-), author, was born in Croydon
 Sir Francis Bond Head (1793–1875), soldier, traveller, author and Lieut. Governor of Upper Canada (1836–1838), had his home at Duppas Hill, Croydon
 Chris Heath (1959–), actor, author, comedian
 Roy Hodgson, football manager and former player, born in Croydon, Attended John Ruskin Grammar School.
 Joseph Holbrooke (1822–1876), composer of stage, choral, and orchestral music
 Roy Hudd, comedian, born in Croydon in 1936

J

 Len Jarrett (1921–), former Director of Administration of the World Scout Bureau; former World Organizer of Scoutings's Jamboree-on-the-Air for thirty years; Croydon born
Nora Johnston (1886–1952), carillon performer and inventor of the mobile carillon
Finn Jones (1988–), Croydon raised
 Oliver Jones (1986–), Croydon born dubstep producer otherwise known as Skream

K

 Steve Kember (1948–), footballer, born in Croydon
 George Knowland (1922–1945), Victoria Cross recipient
 Krept and Konan, UK rap duo, raised in Gipsy Hill, Lambeth and Thornton Heath, Croydon respectively
 Rachel Keen (1997–), singer/songwriter, known as Raye, raised in Croydon
 Nish Kumar (1985-), comedian, grew up in Bromley and Croydon

L

 Andrew Lawrence
 D. H. Lawrence (1885–1930), author; lived at 12 Colworth Road, Addiscombe, 1908–1912, whilst a teacher at Davidson Road School
 Sir David Lean (1908–1991), film director, born in Croydon
 Iain Lee (1973–), comedian, born in South Croydon
 Mike Leeder (1968–), Hong Kong based Film Producer, Casting Director and sometimes actor, born and raised in Croydon
 E G Handel Lucas (1861–1936), artist, lived in Croydon from 1861 to 1909

M

 Kirsty MacColl (1959–2000), singer and songwriter, born and grew up in Croydon
 Miles Malleson (1888–1969), actor and dramatist, born in Croydon
 Jimi Manuwa (1980–), American-born English mixed martial artist
 Ursula Martinez (1966–), cabaret and burlesque entertainer
 David McAlmont (1967–), British vocalist and songwriter, born in Croydon 
 Duke McKenzie (1963–), world champion boxer
 Ralph McTell (1944–), musician, composer of "Streets of London"
 Katie Melua (1984–), singer, songwriter, musician, went to the Brit School for Performing Arts at Selhurst, Croydon
 Graham Moodie (1981–), Olympic hockey player
 Kate Moss (1974–), model
 Malcolm Muggeridge (1903–1990), author and media personality; son of H. T. Muggeridge, a prominent Croydon Labour councillor; taught at John Ruskin Central School in the 1920s

N

 Habib Nasib Nader (1979–), actor, writer
 Kate Nash (1987–), singer/songwriter; attended Brit School, Croydon

O

 Lawrence Okoye, athlete, attended Whitgift School
 Tarik O'Regan (1978–), composer, attended Elmhurst and Whitgift Schools, Croydon

P
 Sue Perkins (1969–), comedian, writer, performer
 Christopher Pitcher (1973–), cricketer
 Lucy Porter, comedian, raised in Croydon
 Simon Prebble (1942–), actor, narrator
 Dickie Pride (1941-1969), rock and roll and jazz singer
 Luke Pritchard, lead singer of The Kooks, attended the Brit School, Croydon
 David Prowse, actor, aka Darth Vader in Star Wars; born in Bristol, lived in Addiscombe, Croydon for over 40 years
 Jason Puncheon (1986–) English professional footballer who plays in midfield for Crystal Palace

R

 Chris Reed (1982–), BBC Radio One dubstep and grime DJ/producer (AKA Plastician)
 Jamie Reid (1947–), situationist, artist, graphic designer 
 Robert Reid, rally driver, lives in a flat in South Croydon
 Susanna Reid (1970–), BBC television presenter; born in Croydon, attended Croham Hurst School and Croydon High School
 Nigel Reo-Coker, current English midfielder, playing for Bolton Wanderers and formerly of Wimbledon F.C., West Ham United and Aston Villa; born in Thornton Heath
Phillip Rhys, actor
 Bridget Riley (1931–), painter, one of the foremost proponents of op art; born in Norbury
 Francis Ronalds (1788–1873), inventor, lived in Croydon in the period 1823–33 and manufactured his patented drawing instruments here 
 Martyn Rooney (1987–), international sprinter
 Nadia Rose (1993–), recording artist 
 John Ruskin (1819–1900), art critic and social theorist; spent much of childhood in Croydon at his mother's family home and visited often as an adult; his parents are buried in Shirley

S

 Peter Sarstedt (1942–2017), singer, winner of Ivor Novello Award; resident
 Danny Schwarz, model
 Kellie Shirley, EastEnders actress
 Emile Smith Rowe (born 2000), Arsenal footballer, was born in Croydon and spent his early life in Thornton Heath
 Bernard Spear (1919–2003), actor (Yentob)
 William Stanley, (1829–1909), philanthropist, inventor, engineer, author, and artist. Lived most of his life in South Norwood, he designed and built Stanley Halls. South Norwood 
 E.L.G. Stones (1914-1987), professor of medieval history at the University of Glasgow from 1956 to 1978 
 Dan Stevens, actor
 Stormzy, (1993–), musician, raised in Thornton Heath
 Swift, rapper, part of the group Section Boyz, raised in Croydon

T

 Samuel Coleridge Taylor (1875–1912), composer; noted for his cantatas including the Song of Hiawatha trilogy; lived at 30 Dagnall Park, Selhurst and worked and died in St Leonards Road, Waddon
 Sam Taylor-Johnson (born 1967), artist and filmmaker, born in Croydon

W

 Alfred Russel Wallace (1823–1913), naturalist; independently proposed a theory of evolution by natural selection and prompted Charles Darwin to reveal his own unpublished theory sooner than he had intended; lived at 44 St Peter's Road, Croydon
 John Whitgift (ca. 1530–1604), Archbishop of Canterbury; buried in the Parish Church of St John the Baptist; several other Archbishops are buried in the Parish Church or St Mary's in Addington
 Rickie Haywood Williams (1982–), TV and radio presenter currently working for MTV and Kiss 100 London
 Karl "Konan" Wilson, half of the British Rap duo "Krept and Konan", from Thornton Heath
 Amy Winehouse (1983–2011), singer, attended Brit School, Croydon
 Wilfred Wood, served as Bishop of Croydon 1985–2002, the first black Church of England bishop
 Edward Woodward (1930–2009), actor, born in Croydon
 Ian Wright MBE, former Crystal Palace, Arsenal and England football team footballer; lives in Shirley
 Matthew Wright, journalist and television presenter; born and resides in Croydon
 Tom Wright (1957–), architect of Burj Al Arab

Y
 Alfred Gregory Yewen, an Australian agricultural writer, journalist and socialist.

In fiction
 Sarah Jane Smith, the popular fictional companion of the Third and Fourth Doctors in the British science fiction television series Doctor Who
 Jeremy "Jez" Osbourne and Mark Corrigan, the fictional protagonists from the Channel 4 sitcom Peep Show, live in a flat in West Croydon.
 Captain Kevin Darling from the BBC sitcom Blackadder Goes Forth lived in Croydon with his girlfriend Doris. Darling was also a wicket keeper for the Croydon Gentlemen cricket team.
 Terry and June, the protagonists of the BBC sitcom of the same name, lived in Purley, a suburb of Croydon.

References

Croydon